The Great Mosque of Maarat al-Numan is a 12th-century Ayyubid-era mosque in the city of Maarat al-Numan between Hama and Aleppo in Syria.

See also
 History of medieval Arabic and Western European domes
 Chahartaq (architecture)

References

Bibliography

Ayyubid mosques in Syria
Mosques in Syria
Buildings and structures in Idlib Governorate
12th-century mosques